Francis Patterson may refer to:

 Francis F. Patterson Jr. (1867–1935), American Republican Party politician
 Francis E. Patterson (1821–1862), United States Army general

See also 
 Frank Patterson (disambiguation)